Stephen Kabora is an Anglican bishop in Kenya; since 2014 he has been the Bishop of Nyahururu.

Notes

21st-century Anglican bishops of the Anglican Church of Kenya
Anglican bishops of Nyahururu
Year of birth missing (living people)
Living people